European route E 429 is part of the international E-road network.

Route 
 
 E403 Tournai
 Ath
 Enghien
 Halle

External links 
 UN Economic Commission for Europe: Overall Map of E-road Network (2007)
 International E-road network

429
E429